El malvado Carabel ("The Evil Carabel") is a 1962 Mexican film. It stars Sara García.

External links
 

1962 films
Mexican comedy-drama films
1960s Spanish-language films
1960s Mexican films